Stephens County is a county in the northeastern part of the U.S. state of Georgia, in the Piedmont and near the foothills of the Blue Ridge Mountains. It is bounded by the Tugaloo River and Lake Hartwell on the east. As of the 2020 census, the population was 26,784. The county seat is Toccoa.

Stephens County comprises the Toccoa, Georgia Micropolitan Statistical Area.

History
The county was long inhabited by indigenous peoples. People of the South Appalachian Mississippian culture developed a village and a platform mound on Tugaloo Island about 800 CE. The village and mound, both known as Tugaloo, were later occupied by other peoples until about 1700. Numerous other villages also developed along the river and its tributaries. Descendants of the Mississippians have been identified as the proto-Creek (Muscogee people).  Allied with them in historic times were the Yuchi, who occupied the village known as Tugaloo, where they were replaced by the Cherokee.  

While Cherokee began to move into this area from Tennessee under pressure by European Americans during and after the Revolutionary War, the Muscogee Creek continued to dominate the southern part of the county until they ceded their land to the United States in a treaty of 1794.

United States era

It was not until after the American Revolutionary War that European Americans began to settle here. The first were veterans who had been given land grants in lieu of pay; they migrated up the Savannah River and the Tugaloo River after the war. 

The county was created on August 18, 1905, from parts of Franklin and Habersham counties, and was named for Alexander Stephens, U.S. representative, Vice President of the Confederate States of America, and fifty-third governor of Georgia.

Toccoa was designated as the county seat and was the site of the county's two courthouses. The first courthouse was built in 1907, and is now listed on the National Register of Historic Places. The second was built in 2000. The former courthouse is now used for county offices.

Despite the Great Depression, more industry developed in the county in the 1930s. J&P Coats Company purchased the Capps Cotton Mill in 1937 and operated it for nearly 70 years, before textile manufacturing jobs moved offshore to cheaper labor markets. In 1938 industrialist R.G. LeTourneau opened a manufacturing plant for earth-moving equipment. Later that year the Toccoa Airport was constructed. During World War II, the LeTourneau plant produced equipment for use by the military, employing 2000 people in this effort. In addition the US Army developed Camp Toccoa here, for training paratroopers. 

Beginning in 1950, planning began for what was called the Hartwell Project, which envisioned dams on the Savanna and tributary rivers for flood control and hydropower generation. In addition, a large reservoir would be created, known as Lake Hartwell. 

Prior to the flooding of this area by Lake Hartwell, produced behind the Hartwell Dam on the Savannah River, archeological studies were conducted in 1958 of known prehistoric and historic sites in the area. Among them, the Tugaloo Mound and village site by a team from the University of Georgia. The mound is still visible above the water, and a historic marker on Highway 123 at the Georgia-South Carolina border helps mark this spot.

On November 6, 1977, the earthen Kelly Barnes Dam collapsed after a period of heavy rainfall. The resulting flood swept through the campus of Toccoa Falls College, killing 39 people and causing $2.8 million in damage.

Geography
The county is located mainly within the upper Piedmont region of the state, with western portions of the county having the highest elevations and located in the foothills of the Blue Ridge Mountains.

The northern half of Stephens County is located in the Tugaloo River sub-basin of the Savannah River basin. Lake Hartwell was created as a reservoir on the river after the construction of Hartwell Dam on the Savannah, completed in 1962. The southern half of the county is located in the Broad River sub-basin of the same Savannah River basin.

Major highways

  U.S. Route 123
  State Route 17
  State Route 17 Alternate
  State Route 63
  State Route 105
  State Route 106
  State Route 145
  State Route 184
  State Route 328
  State Route 365

Adjacent counties
 Oconee County, South Carolina (north)
 Franklin County (south)
 Banks County (southwest)
 Habersham County (west)

National protected area
 Chattahoochee National Forest (part)

Demographics

2020 census

As of the 2020 United States Census, there were 26,784 people, 9,543 households, and 6,783 families residing in the county.

2010 census
As of the 2010 United States Census, there were 26,175 people, 10,289 households, and 7,236 families residing in the county. The racial makeup of the county was 85.1% white, 10.9% black or African American, 0.7% Asian, 0.3% American Indian, 0.1% Pacific islander, 1.0% from other races, and 2.0% from two or more races. Those of Hispanic or Latino origin made up 2.4% of the population. In terms of ancestry, 14.7% were American, 9.1% were Irish, 8.1% were German, and 7.4% were English.

Of the 10,289 households, 31.5% had children under the age of 18 living with them, 52.8% were married couples living together, 13.2% had a female householder with no husband present, 29.7% were non-families, and 25.7% of all households were made up of individuals. The average household size was 2.49 and the average family size was 2.96. The median age was 40.7 years.

The median income for a household in the county was $34,938 and the median income for a family was $41,768. Males had a median income of $35,814 versus $24,834 for females. The per capita income for the county was $18,285. About 12.3% of families and 18.8% of the population were below the poverty line, including 25.9% of those under age 18 and 16.0% of those age 65 or over.

Communities
 Avalon
 Eastanollee
 Martin
 Toccoa (county seat)

Politics

Further reading
 Cooksey, Elizabeth B. "Stephens County." New Georgia Encyclopedia. October 14, 2014. Web. May 18, 2016.

See also

 National Register of Historic Places listings in Stephens County, Georgia
 North Georgia Technical College
 Toccoa Falls College
List of counties in Georgia

References

External links

 Official Stephens County website
 Stephens County Development Authority
 Toccoa-Stephens County Chamber of Commerce
 Things to do in Stephens County
 Stephens County history 
 Toccoa-Stephens County community website

 
Georgia (U.S. state) counties
Northeast Georgia
Counties of Appalachia
Populated places established in 1905
1905 establishments in Georgia (U.S. state)